Mary Ng  (born December 16, 1969) is a Canadian politician serving as Minister of International Trade, Export Promotion, Small Business and Economic Development since 2018. A member of the Liberal Party of Canada, she has been the member of Parliament (MP) for the riding of Markham—Thornhill since a by-election on April 3, 2017.

Early life
Ng was born in British Hong Kong on December 16, 1969, and is the eldest child of three. In the 1970s, Ng's parents immigrated to Canada from Hong Kong, later establishing a family-owned restaurant in Toronto, Ontario. Along with her brother and sister, Ng grew up working in the family's restaurant. She graduated with a Bachelor of Arts from the University of Toronto Scarborough in 1996, majoring in political science.

Career
Ng has worked for 20 years in the public service, focusing on the areas of education, women's leadership, job-creation, and entrepreneurship.

Ng worked as a public servant in the Ontario Ministry of the Attorney General and Cabinet Office, served as the director of policy to the Ontario education minister Gerard Kennedy.

From 2006 to 2008 and then again from 2011 to 2015, Ng served in the President's Office at Ryerson University.

Federal politics
Following the resignation of Markham—Thornhill MP John McCallum, Ng announced in February 2017 her intention to seek the Liberal Party of Canada nomination for the riding, and won the nomination that March against two other candidates. She proceeded to win the seat at the riding by-election held on April 3 that year.

Member of Parliament 
Ng helped to facilitate the government's commitment to invest in Canadian ideas and innovators in her riding by advocating for the inclusion of Markham's tech-innovation hub, VentureLabs, in the Southern Ontario Supercluster.

Ng holds roles on Parliamentary Associations such as the Canada-China Legislative Association and the Canadian NATO Parliamentary Association. In June 2019, Ng publicly announced Michael Chan as her re-election campaign co-chair, which led to questions of potential pro-Beijing influence in her campaign.

Cabinet minister 
Ng was appointed Minister of Small Business and Export Promotion in the cabinet reshuffle in July 2018. Following her re-election as MP in the 2019 federal election, she was named Minister of Small Business, Export Promotion and International Trade, adding the trade portfolio to her responsibilities and becoming jointly responsible for Trudeau's foreign policy.

In 2019, Ng attended People's Republic of China 70th anniversary celebrations with Toronto consulate official Han Tao. In response, members of the group Torontonians Stand With Hong Kong indicated concern that Ng could hold the same pro-Beijing positions as those allegedly held by her campaign co-chair, Michael Chan.

After the 2021 election, Ng's responsibilities expanded to include Economic Development. She remains the minister responsible for Canada's trade negotiations, overseeing crown corporations including Business Development Canada and Export Development Canada, and promoting small business through grant funding.

On December 13, 2022, Mario Dion, the federal ethics commissioner, released a report finding that Ng had broken ethics rules in 2019 and 2020 by failing to recuse herself and awarding two government media training contracts – worth $16,950 and $5,840  – to the public relations firm Pomp&Circumstance that her friend of 20 years, Amanda Alvaro, had co-founded. After the release of the report, Ng apologized and issued a statement saying that she should have recused herself. Ng reportedly did not consider resigning or repaying the money after the ethics breach.

Electoral record

References

External links
 

Living people
Liberal Party of Canada MPs
Members of the 29th Canadian Ministry
Members of the House of Commons of Canada from Ontario
Members of the King's Privy Council for Canada
University of Toronto alumni
Women government ministers of Canada
Women members of the House of Commons of Canada
Women in Ontario politics
People from Markham, Ontario
People from North York
Politicians from Toronto
Hong Kong emigrants to Canada
1969 births
21st-century Canadian women politicians